The East African Orogeny (EAO) is the main stage in the Neoproterozoic assembly of East and West Gondwana (Australia–India–Antarctica and Africa–South America) along the Mozambique Belt.

Gondwana assembly
The notion that Gondwana was assembled during the Late Precambrian from two older fragments along the Pan-African Mozambique Belt was first proposed in the early 1980s.  A decade later this continental collision was named the East African Orogeny, but it was also realised that this was not the simple bringing together of two halves.  Rather, it was the piecemeal assembly of several much smaller cratonic elements that once formed an earlier supercontinent (today known as Rodinia), a process that eventually culminated in the relatively short-lived Gondwanan supercontinent.

Two partly incomparable scenarios have been proposed for this assembly. In another model, the assembly of East Gondwana   was a multiphase process which included two main periods of orogenesis: the older EAO and the younger Kuunga Orogeny. In the former scenario the Kuunga Orogeny of the latter scenario are two coeval events: the collisions between India and Australia-East Antarctica and Azania and India. Furthermore, the two orogens of the latter scenario intersect in Madagascar, the proposed location of the Azania-India collision, and this part of the Kuunga Orogeny should be renamed the Malagasy Orogeny.

Erosion and Cambrian explosion
The East African orogeny resulted in the formation of an enormous mountain chain, known as the Transgondwanan Supermountain, which was more than -long and -wide. These unprecedented sedimentary depositions probably made the diversification of early animal life possible.

The orogen was eroded to such extent that by the Ordovician epoch it had been leveled to a planation surface in Ethiopia.

Cenozoic reopening
The Cenozoic East African Rift System mostly evolved along the complex pattern of Proterozoic prerift systems in eastern Africa.  It passes through the Mozambique Belt east of the Tanzania Craton.

References

Sources

 
 
 
 
 
 
 
 
 
 

Orogenies of Africa
Neoproterozoic Africa
Neoproterozoic orogenies